Redferd Segers House, also known as the Kenneth Hoffman House, is a historic home located at Crenshaw in Snyder Township, Jefferson County, Pennsylvania. It was built about 1870, and is a -story, "L"-shaped frame dwelling on a stone foundation.  It is an eclectic example of domestic Stick/Eastlake, Gothic Revival, Italianate, and Shingle-style. It features a hipped roof with intersecting gables, ornamental cornice, and patterned shingling. Redferd Segers (1834-1913) was a prominent local businessman.

It was added to the National Register of Historic Places in 2000.

References

Houses on the National Register of Historic Places in Pennsylvania
Gothic Revival architecture in Pennsylvania
Queen Anne architecture in Pennsylvania
Houses completed in 1870
Houses in Jefferson County, Pennsylvania
National Register of Historic Places in Jefferson County, Pennsylvania